Lista insulsalis is a species of moth of the family Pyralidae. It was described by Julius Lederer  in 1863, and is known from Lianping, Guangdong; and Ningpo, Zhejiang, China.

References

Moths described in 1863
Epipaschiinae